Basil I the Macedonian (c. 811 – 886) was a Byzantine emperor and founder of the Macedonian dynasty.

Basil I may also refer to:
 Basil I of Constantinople, surnamed Scamandrenus, Patriarch of Constantinople 970–974
 Basil I of Bulgaria, Patriarch of Bulgaria c. 1186 – c. 1232
 Basil I of Russia (1371–1425), Grand Prince of Moscow and Vladimir 1389–1425
 Vasilije, Serbian Patriarch in 1763–1765